Sankarpur is a census town in the Pandabeswar CD block in the Durgapur subdivision of the Paschim Bardhaman district in the Indian state of West Bengal.

Geography

Location
Konardihi, Nabgram, Chak Bankola, Sankarpur, Haripur, Bahula, Chhora and Parashkol form a cluster of census towns in the southern portion of Pandabeswar CD Block.

Urbanisation
According to the 2011 census, 79.22% of the population of the Durgapur subdivision was urban and 20.78% was rural. The Durgapur subdivision has 1 municipal corporation at Durgapur and 38 (+1 partly) census towns  (partly presented in the map alongside; all places marked on the map are linked in the full-screen map).

Demographics
According to the 2011 Census of India, Sankarpur had a total population of 6,399, of which 3,317 (52%) were males and 3,082 (48%) were females. Population in the age range 0–6 years was 822. The total number of literate persons in Sankarpur was 4,271 (76.58% of the population over 6 years).

*For language details see Pandabeswar (community development block)#Language and religion

 India census, Sankarpur had a population of 5921. Males constitute 53% of the population and females 47%. Sankarpur has an average literacy rate of 60%, higher than the national average of 59.5%: male literacy is 68%, and female literacy is 51%. In Sankarpur, 13% of the population is under 6 years of age.

Infrastructure

According to the District Census Handbook 2011, Bardhaman, Sankarpur covered an area of 3.31 km2. Among the civic amenities, the protected water-supply involved service reservoir, tap water from treated sources, uncovered wells. It had 568 domestic electric connections. Among the medical facilities it had were 1 dispensary/ health centre, 1 maternity/ child welfare centre, charitable hospital/ nursing home, 3 medicine shops. Among the educational facilities it had were 2 primary schools, 1 middle school, 1 secondary school, the nearest senior secondary school at Ukhra 2 km away.

Economy
According to the ECL website telephone numbers, operational collieries in the Bankola Area of Eastern Coalfields in 2018 are: Bankola Colliery, Khandra Colliery, Kumardih A Colliery, Kumardih B Colliery, Moira Colliery, Nakrakonda Colliery, Shankarpur Colliery, Shyamsundarpur Colliery and Tilaboni Colliery.

Education
Sankarpur has two primary and one higher secondary schools.

Healthcare
Medical facilities (periodic medical examination centres and dispensaries) in the Bankola Area of ECL are available at Bankola Area PME Centre (with 30 beds + 2 cabins) (PO Ukhra), Khandra (PO Khandra), Bankola Colliery (PO Khandra), Bankola Area (PO Khandra), Shyamsundarpur (PO Khandra), Mahira (PO Moira), Tilaboni (PO Pandabeswar), Nakrakonda (PO Pandabeswar), Shankarpur (PO Sheetalpur), Kumardihi A (PO Pandabeswar), Kumardihi B (PO Pandabeswar).

References

Cities and towns in Paschim Bardhaman district